The West Coast Memorial to the Missing of World War II is a monument dedicated to missing soldiers, sailors, marines,  coast guardsmen, and airmen of World War II. It is a curved wall of California granite set in a grove of Monterey pine and cypress and overlooking the Pacific Ocean. It bears the name, rank, organization and State of each of the 413 members of the Armed Forces who lost their lives or were buried at sea in the Pacific coastal waters.

It is located on high ground overlooking Baker Beach along the Pacific Ocean, at the intersection of Lincoln and Kobbe Boulevards, along the western edge of the Presidio of San Francisco, California.

The architect was Hervey Parke Clark with landscape architecture by Lawrence Halprin.  The sculptor was Jean de Marco, who won the 1965 Henry Hering Memorial Award for his work here.

The West Coast Memorial is one of three war memorials in the United States administered by the American Battle Monuments Commission; the others are the East Coast Memorial to the Missing of World War II in New York and the Honolulu Memorial.

References
National Park Service 
American Battle Monuments Commission 
West Coast memorial at Find a grave

Monuments and memorials in California
World War II memorials in the United States
History of San Francisco
Golden Gate National Recreation Area
1965 sculptures
Granite sculptures in California
1965 establishments in California
Statues in San Francisco
Outdoor sculptures in San Francisco